D²B (Domestic Digital Bus, IEC 61030) is an IEC standard for a low-speed multi-master serial communication bus for home automation applications. It was originally developed by Philips in the 1980s. In 2006 it has been withdrawn by IEC because another standard was proposed, JTC1 SC 83/WG1. There remain many IEC61030-compliant devices, such as some Philips-branded head units and CD changers from car stereos.

The SCART connector provides a D²B connection for inter-device communication.

See also 
 I²C
 ISO/IEC JTC 1

References

External links 
 ANSI eStandards bookstore page for IEC 61030
 

Home automation